Dar Kul may refer to:

 Dar Kul, Aligudarz
 Dar Kul, Khorramabad